The Sigma DP2 Merrill is a high-end compact digital camera made by Sigma Corporation. It features a 46-megapixel Foveon X3 sensor (4704 × 3136 × 3 layers) and a 30mm f/2.8 fixed lens (45mm in 35mm equivalent focal length).

Software

Sigma Photo Pro 

Postprocessing of raw X3F and JPEG of all digital SIGMA cameras

Version 6.x is a free download for Windows 7+ and Mac OS from Version 10.7 (6.3.x). Actual versions are 6.5.4 (Win 7+) and 6.5.5 (MacOSX 10.9+).

References

DP2 Merrill